The Mother of God Church It is a Latin Catholic church, built in a Gothic style, located in Vladivostok in the Far East of Russia.
 
It is the seat of the deanery of Vladivostok, which depends on the Diocese of Irkutsk. It is located at 22 Volodarsky Street. It was formerly a cathedral church.

History 
Catholics, mostly Poles, were present in Vladivostok since the mid-nineteenth century. The first Catholic parish in the Siberian Far East appeared during the reign of Alexander II in the city of Nikolaevsk Amur, newly founded in 1866. The city was then the seat of the Czarist Governor General of the Russian Far East.
 
As the imperial (later Soviet) fleet moved to Vladivostok, the new port and fortress under construction attracted a number of people who came from all corners of the Empire, including Polish Catholics, Lithuanians etc. They were artisans, merchants, simple workers or soldiers.
 
The municipal assembly (Duma) donated the land in 1885 until 1886. The parish itself was erected on January 11, 1890, a few months before the start of the construction of the Trans-Siberian Railway to Vladivostok from May 1891.

From 1923 to 2002, Vladivostok was the cathedral episcopal see of the Roman Catholic Diocese of Vladivostok, which was merged into the Diocese of Saint Joseph at Irkutsk and remains a deanery.

See also 
 Roman Catholicism in Russia
 Mother of God Church

References 

Buildings and structures in Vladivostok
European diaspora in Siberia
Gothic Revival church buildings in Russia
Lithuanian diaspora in Siberia
Polish diaspora in Siberia
Roman Catholic churches completed in 1890
Religious buildings and structures in the Russian Far East
Roman Catholic cathedrals in Russia
19th-century Roman Catholic church buildings in Russia
Cultural heritage monuments of regional significance in Primorsky Krai